Camila Vezzoso is a model from Uruguay and a beauty queen titleholder who was crowned Miss Uruguay 2012. She also represented Uruguay in the 2012 Miss Universe pageant.  Following the contests, she moved to Paris and is currently pursuing a modeling career.

Contests

Elite Model Look 2010
Camilla was a second runner-up at Elite Model Look 2010 in Uruguay.

Miss Uruguay 2012
Camila Vezzoso was  crowned Miss Universo Uruguay 2012 in Montevideo, Uruguay on Thursday, 31 May 2012.

Miss Universe 2012
She went to Colombia and Venezuela for preparation in makeup, public speaking, and runway, representing Uruguay at Miss Universe 2012 held in December that year.

Miss United Continent 2013
On 14 September 2013, Vezzoso participated in the Miss United Continent 2013 pageant in Guayaquil, Ecuador. She placed 3rd.

References

External links
 Official Miss Uruguay website

1993 births
Living people
Miss Universe 2012 contestants
Uruguayan beauty pageant winners
Uruguayan female models